At the 7th National Games of the People's Republic of China, the athletics events were held in Beijing in September 1993.

Medal summary

Men's events

Women's events

References
7th National Games medallists . jx918. Retrieved on 2013-03-30.
Chinese Go wild - An orgy of World Records. Crown Diamond. Retrieved on 2013-03-30.

1993 National Games of China
1993
Chinese Games
Athletics in Beijing